Exclusive is the second studio album by American singer-songwriter Chris Brown. It was released on November 6, 2007, by CBE, Jive Records. The record serves as Chris Brown's second studio release under his CBE record label, as well as with Jive. The record also serves as the follow-up to his multi-platinum selling debut album, Chris Brown (2005).

Exclusive is an R&B record that contains slight influences of pop and electro-hop. Lyrically it revolves around romance. The album was commercially successful worldwide. It debuted at number four on the US Billboard 200, selling 295,000 copies in the first week. The album was supported by five singles, with three of the singles becoming top three hits on the Billboard Hot 100, and also charting highly on other charts worldwide. This album earned a quadruple platinum certification by the Recording Industry Association of America (RIAA) in the United States. Exclusive received generally positive reviews from critics, that praised Brown's performances.

On June 3, 2008, Exclusive was re-released as a double-disc deluxe edition, titled The Forever Edition, which includes 4 more songs, including the singles "Forever" and "Superhuman", a bonus DVD featuring behind-the-scenes footage from his tour and his music videos.

Background
In 2006, following the success of Brown's self-titled album, the singer started to work on his sophomore album, developing its concept along with Tina Davis and Mark Pitts. Brown co-wrote half of the tracks along with different writers, including Sean Garrett, James Fauntleroy, Johntá Austin and Tank. The musical direction aimed for the album was different to the hip hop soul-influenced sound of the previous album, being worked as an R&B album appealable to a wider public.

Initially, Brown wanted the album to be named Graduation, but after knowing from Kanye West that the rapper's third studio album, dropping that same year, was intentioned to be named the same way, he respected his decision and changed the name of his album to Exclusive. Brown explained to MTV News: "at first I was naming it Graduation because I was 18 and the album was supposed to be my musical consolidation, but then Kanye was like, 'I heard Chris is naming his album Graduation. I'm naming mine ... .', I was like, I'll change mine because I respect his reason more with College Dropout and Late Registration, all that, so it kind of went with his. So I was like, I don't need mine to be Graduation, you know, I'll change mine to Exclusive, because I'll make an album exclusively for those that will support it".The album was originally set to be released on August 28, 2007.

Singles
The album's lead single, "Wall to Wall" was released on May 29, 2007. The song was produced by Sean Garrett, written by Walter Scott. The single reached at number 79 on the US Billboard Hot 100, due to no digital release for this single.

"Kiss Kiss"; a collaboration with a fellow American recording artist T-Pain, was released as the album's second single on September 11, 2007. Following the non-success of his first single, this single became a big success in the United States. The song reached at number one on the Billboard Hot 100, and number 6 on the Canadian Hot 100, also reaching the top ten in Australia, Canada and New Zealand.

"With You" was released as the album's third single on December 4, 2007. The song was produced by the production team StarGate. The single became his second successful single in the most international music markets. It has since become one of the highest-charting singles of Brown's solo career, entering the foreign music markets, where his previous efforts have failed to these charts. It has reached the top ten; including in Australia, Canada, Ireland, New Zealand, and United Kingdom.

The re-release of its first single from The Forever Edition, called "Forever" (produced by Polow da Don). It was released on April 29, 2008. The song debuted at number 9 on the Billboard Hot 100, due of its high digital sales. However, it dropped quickly due to the lack of sales during these following weeks. The song then re-entered the top ten again, after airplay increases and has peaked at number 2.

Critical reception

Exclusive received generally positive reviews from critics, scoring 69 out of 100 based on 11 reviews on Metacritic. Andy Kellman of AllMusic praised Brown singing ability reviewing the album, and found that its material to "push all the right target-demographic buttons". Rob Sheffield from Rolling Stone said that “Brown seals the deal with Exclusive, an all-grown-up album on a level with Justin Timberlake's Justified (2002), Rihanna's Good Girl Gone Bad (2007) or even Bobby Brown's King of Stage (1986)", ending up saying "it's hard to imagine he doesn't have an album's worth of hits here". Mark Hammers of Boston Globe in a positive review said that"If there was ever a record created to turn an R&B singer into a superstar, it's Brown's sophomore effort". Vibes Iyana Robertson stated that on Exclusive Brown is "tapping more electric up-tempos, swimming deep in hip-hop waters and annihilating the pop arena".

Neil Drumming from Entertainment Weekly rated the album as B− said that, "Like his onscreen (This Christmas) character, Brown is most charming when he's playing up his youth: singing of MySpace romance, meeting his girl's 'pops,' and such". But he also said, "sadly, Brown's adolescent voice and playful scatting — while cute — are steamrolled by pushy collaborators, whether it's those Stargate guys (Ne-Yo, Rihanna) falling back on that ol' guitar noodling, or T-Pain milking his vocoder. Ease back, people, and let the boy sing". However, Sal Cinquemani of Slant Magazine criticized the unoriginality of the album, writing, "...there's still nothing very 'exclusive' about Exclusive at all." Michael Arceneaux of PopMatters wrote, "Exclusive seems aimless, an album where Brown is doing what he’s told versus being the anchor of his own ship." The album ranked number 34 on Rolling Stones list of the Top 50 Albums of 2007.

Accolades
At the 2008 Grammy Awards, Exclusive was nominated for a Grammy Award in the category of "Best Rap/Sung Collaboration" for "Kiss Kiss", a collaboration with T-Pain. However, the award was given to the 2007 rival single, "Umbrella" by Rihanna featuring Jay-Z. The album also nominated for a NAACP Image Awards in a category for "Best Album", while Chris himself won for "Best Male Artist". At the 2008 BET Awards, Chris received 4 nominations in four categories, including "Best Male R&B Artist", "Best Collaboration" for "Kiss Kiss", and "Viewer’s Choice" for "Kiss Kiss" and "No Air", his duet with Jordin Sparks.

On June 22, 2008, Fearne & Reggie revealed on their UK's chart show BBC Radio 1, that all three tracks from the album Exclusive have appeared on the top forty. Two of which on the top ten, including "With You" (at number 35), "No Air" with Jordin Sparks (at number 2), and "Forever" (at number 5).

Commercial performance
Exclusive debuted at number four on the US Billboard 200 chart, with first-week sales of 294,000 copies in the United States. As of March 2011, the album has sold 1,973,000 copies in the United States. In 2021, the album was certified quadruple platinum by the Recording Industry Association of America (RIAA) for sales of over four million copies in the United States.

In the United Kingdom, the album debuted at number 31 on the UK Albums Chart and eventually peaked at number three on the chart. It spent a total of 52 weeks on the chart. On September 5, 2008, the album was certified platinum by the British Phonographic Industry (BPI) for sales of over 300,000 copies in the UK.

Track listing

The Forever Edition includes a DVD with a documentary titled "Chris Brown on Tour", which is a montage of performances from his Up-Close & Personal Tour and behind-the-scenes footage. It also features a cameo appearance from Keyshia Cole, who held her own sold-out Just like You tour.

Two versions of The Forever Edition were made available; the first included the DVD, and the second did not. Only the CD edition was made available in the United Kingdom, while most other countries had both editions available.

Notes
(co.) signifies a co-producer.

Samples credits
"Picture Perfect" samples "A Quiet Place" written by Ralph Carmichael, as performed by Take 6.

BET bonus DVD

BET Presents Chris Brown is a DVD originally packaged with Exclusive, exclusively at Wal-mart. The release features BET highlights, performance highlights, and music videos from throughout Brown's career at that time. It also includes an interview where Brown talks about the making of Exclusive.

Production
 Executive producers: Chris Brown, Clive Calder and Phineas Kelly
 Album mastered by Chris Athens at Sterling Sound, NYC
 A&R administration: Shay Young
 A&R coordination: Leticia Hilliard
 Production coordination: Cara Hutchinson, Brian Gately
 Clearances: David Schmidt, Kobie "The Quarterback" Brown, Donato Guadagnoli, Mattias Eng 
 Art direction and design: Courtney Walter
 Photography: Dave Hill and Mark Mann
 Styling: Mike Bogard for Blynn Group

Charts

Weekly charts

Year-end charts

Certifications

References

External links
 Exclusive at Discogs
 Exclusive at Metacritic

2007 albums
Albums produced by Brian Kennedy (record producer)
Albums produced by Bryan-Michael Cox
Albums produced by Dre & Vidal
Albums produced by Jazze Pha
Albums produced by Kanye West
Albums produced by Polow da Don
Albums produced by Scott Storch
Albums produced by Stargate
Albums produced by Swizz Beatz
Albums produced by T-Pain
Albums produced by the Underdogs (production team)
Albums produced by will.i.am
Chris Brown albums
Jive Records albums
Albums produced by Mars (record producer)
Albums produced by Oak Felder